Danielle "Dani" Kahle (born April 9, 1989 Cedar Rapids, Iowa) is an American former competitive figure skater. She won four medals on the ISU Junior Grand Prix series, including gold in Croatia in 2003, and finished 11th at the 2004 World Junior Championships. She won one senior international medal, silver, at the 2006 Karl Schäfer Memorial.

Career
Kahle first stepped onto the ice at age three but was removed from the class for not listening to the instructor.  She returned to skating two years later.

After winning the novice national title in 2002, Kahle won bronze on the junior level at the 2003 U.S. Championships. She won senior gold titles twice at the Pacific Coast Sectionals (2006, 2007) and twice at the Southwest Pacific Regionals (2006, 2011). Kahle qualified to compete on the senior level at the U.S. Championships six times,  from 2004 to 2011.  Her highest finish was sixth  in 2007.

Kahle competed for four seasons on the ISU Junior Grand Prix, winning four medals—gold at the 2003 Croatia Cup, two silver, and one bronze. She qualified twice for the JGP Final, finishing 6th and 9th. She made her senior international debut at the 2006 Karl Schäfer Memorial and won the silver medal.

In 2010, she sustained a lower back fracture in a car accident.

Kahle trained in El Segundo, California and Simi Valley, California, coached by Frank Carroll and Cindy Bortz-Gould.

Kahle made skating sequences for the Disney feature film, Ice Princess in 2004, and was one of four skaters featured on the 2006 TLC show, Ice Diaries. She was also in the movie Ice Dreams.
She coaches at Iceoplex Arena in Simi Valley and once assisted and coached an annual ice show, the Lion King.

Personal life
Kahle has three brothers and a younger sister, Savannah. As of 2011, she is attending Cal State Northridge.

Programs

Competitive highlights

References

External links

 Danielle Kahle at IceNetwork.com
 Danielle Kahle at the International Skating Union

1989 births
American female single skaters
Figure skating reality television participants
Living people
Sportspeople from Cedar Rapids, Iowa
21st-century American women